Ingestre is a civil parish in the Borough of Stafford, Staffordshire, England. It contains nine listed buildings that are recorded in the National Heritage List for England. Of these, one is listed at Grade I, the highest of the three grades, one is at Grade II*, the middle grade, and the others are at Grade II, the lowest grade.  The parish contains the village of Ingestre and the surrounding area.  The parish is focused around Ingestre Hall, a country house and the adjoining St Mary's Church, which are both listed, together with associated structures including a farmhouse and farm buildings.  The only listed building in the village is a telephone kiosk.


Key

Buildings

References

Citations

Sources

Lists of listed buildings in Staffordshire